Encinacorba is a municipality located in the province of Zaragoza, Aragon, Spain. According to the 2004 census (INE), the municipality has a population of 294 inhabitants.

This town is located near the Sierra de Algairén in the comarca of Campo de Cariñena.

References

Municipalities in the Province of Zaragoza